Maldeamores is a 2007 Puerto Rican film starring Luis Guzmán, written by Carlos Ruíz Ruíz and Jorge Gonzales, and directed by Ruíz and his wife Mariem Pérez Riera.

The film consists of three separate stories dealing with the ironies of love. The three stories involve a middle-class family, a hostage situation, and an elderly couple.

Actor Benicio del Toro (who is from Puerto Rico) worked as an executive producer for the film.

On September 24, 2007, the film was chosen to represent Puerto Rico at the 80th Academy Awards to be celebrated February 24, 2008. The film competed with other four Puerto Rican films and was selected after a tie with Jacobo Morales' Angel. The other three films submitted were: El Cimarrón, Ruido, and El Clown.

Cast
 Luis Guzmán as Ismael
 Miguel Ángel Álvarez as Pellín
 Silvia Brito as Flora
 Yaraní del Valle as Luisa
 Edna Lee Figueroa as Tati
 Luis Gonzaga as Miguel
 Teresa Hernández as Lourdes
 Chavito Marrero as Cirilo
 Dolores Pedro as Marta
 Norman Santiago as Macho
 Fernando Tarrazo as Ismaelito
 Roberto Roman as Robeltain

Awards

See also
 Cinema of Puerto Rico
 List of Puerto Ricans in the Academy Awards

References

External links
 

2007 films
Puerto Rican films
2000s Spanish-language films
2007 comedy-drama films
2007 comedy films
2007 drama films